The 2010 Dow Corning Tennis Classic doubles was held in Midland, Michigan.

In the finals, top seeds Lucie Hradecká and Laura Granville defeated fourth seeds Anna Tatishvili and Lilia Osterloh to win the first edition of the Dow Corning Tennis Classic as a 100K tournament.

Seeds

Draw

Finals

See also 
2010 Dow Corning Tennis Classic - Singles

External Links
Doubles Draw

Dow Corning Tennis Classic
Dow Corning Tennis Classic - Doubles
2010 in sports in Michigan
2010 in American tennis